Estadio Excelsior is a multi-purpose stadium in Puerto Cortés, Honduras.  It is currently used mostly for football matches and is the home stadium of Platense. The stadium holds 10,000 people. This stadium was rebuilt during Marlon Lara administration as Mayor of Puerto Cortés

External links
 Photo of Estadio Excelsion 

Excelsior, Estadio
Multi-purpose stadiums in Honduras
Puerto Cortés
Sports venues completed in 1930
Platense F.C.